Fall is another name for the season autumn.

Fall may also refer to:

 Fall (surname), a surname
 Fall (academic term), usually a semester or a quarter, occurring around the same time as the autumn season
 Fall (accident), including slipping or tripping

Films 
 Fall (1997 film), an American romantic film written by, directed by, and starring Eric Schaeffer
 Fall (2014 film), a Canadian drama film written and directed by Terrance Odette
 Fall (2022 film), an American action-thriller film from Lionsgate

Music

Albums
 Fall (Jon Foreman EP) (2007)
 Fall (Overlake album) (2017)
 Fall (Ride EP) (1990)
 Fall (Clay Walker album) (2007)

Songs 
 "Fall" (Justin Bieber song) (2012)
 "Fall" (Davido song)
 "Fall" (Eminem song)
 "Fall" (Natalia Lesz song)
 "Fall" (Clay Walker song) (2007)
 "Fall", a song by Brandy from Human
 "Fall", a song by Chloe x Halle from Sugar Symphony
 "Fall", a 2005 song by Editors from The Back Room
 "Fall", a 1987 song by the Jesus and Mary Chain from the album Darklands
 "Fall", a song by the Psychedelic Furs from The Psychedelic Furs
 "Fall", a 2011 song by the Saturdays from Chasing Lights
 "Fall", a 2000 song by Sevendust from Scream 3: The Album
 "Fall", a 1968 song by Wayne Shorter from Nefertiti

Places 
 Fall, Iran, a village in Fars Province
 Fall (Lenggries), a village in Bavaria (subdivision of Lenggries, Bad Tölz-Wolfratshausen district, Germany)

Other uses 
 Fall (nautical term), the part of a rope that is hauled on in a block-and-tackle arrangement
 Fall (unit), a Scottish measurement of length
 Fall; or, Dodge in Hell, a 2019 speculative fiction novel by Neal Stephenson
 "Fall" (Once Upon a Time), an episode of Once Upon a Time
 Fall, the sudden arrival of birds due to drift migration
 Fall, the sepals of the Iris flower

See also 
 Astrological fall, a planet in a form of debilitated essential dignity
 The Fall (disambiguation)
 Fall Kill, a creek in New York
 Fallen (disambiguation)
 Falling (disambiguation)
 Falling Down (disambiguation)
 Fallout (disambiguation)
 Falls (disambiguation)
 The Falls (disambiguation)
 Fell (disambiguation)
 Meteorite fall, a meteorite recovered after being observed entering the atmosphere
 Phall, a very hot curry dish
 Pin fall and related terms, jargon in the sport of wrestling
 Waterfall